This article provides a detailed list of the cities and towns along the Euphrates River in order of country.

Cities in Turkey

The Euphrates is formed by the union of two branches, the Karasu or Kara River (the western Euphrates), which rises in eastern Turkey north of Erzurum, and the Murat (the eastern Euphrates). These rivers merge in the Elazığ Province of Turkey, where the river is dammed in several places such as the Keban Dam, the Karakaya Dam, Atatürk Dam, the Birecik Dam, and Karkamis Dam. Beneath the lakes of these dams are ancient towns like Samsat. Other towns like Elif, Hasanoğlu and Hisar in the Araban district of Gaziantep date back to Roman times. Halfeti, a district of Şanlıurfa, mentioned as “Halpa” in the Urartu inscriptions.

The following is a partial list of other cities and towns in Turkey that border the Euphrates. 
 Rumkale (Hromgla)
 Arulis (Gümüşgün) was an important centre of the Kommagene kingdom
 Zeugma known as “Seleukeia Euphrates” in the Hellenistic period
 Birecik
 Arsameia

Cities in Syria

The upper reaches of the Euphrates flow through steep canyons and gorges, southeast across Syria, and through Iraq. From west to east, the Euphrates is in Syria joined by the Sajur, the Balikh and the Khabur. Lake Assad is a large lake in Syria on the Euphrates River formed by the construction of the Tabqa Dam in 1973. The sites of Tell Abu Hureyra and Mureybet ancient Mesopotamian cities of the Euphrates, are underneath this lake.

 Jarabulus—on the border of Turkey and Syria
 Maskanah is on Lake Assad
 Al-Thawrah
 Raqqa
 Abu Hamam
 Deir ez-Zor District
 Deir ez-Zor 
 al-Kasrah 
 Al-Busayrah is at the confluence of the Euphrates with the Khabur river. 
 Al-Muhasan
 Al-Tabni
 Al-Masrab
 Khasham
 Al-Suwar
 Mayadin District
 Mayadin
 Diban
 Al-Quriyah
 Al-Asharah 
 Abu Kamal District
 Al-Salihiyah
 Al-Jalaa
 Hajin
 Al-Shaafah
 Al-Susah
 Abu Kamal (or  Al-Bukamal) - on the border of Syria and Iraq

Cities in Iraq

In Iraq, the Euphrates is known as "Nahr al Furat". As it crosses the Syrian border, the Euphrates flows into Iraq  near Al-Qa'im in Al Anbar Province. Between Anah and Haditha, the Haditha Dam creates a large lake, known as Lake Qadisiyah. Between the Syrian border and the town of Hit (in the Heet District), shoals and rapids make the river commercially unnavigable. Once it reaches Hit, the Euphrates is still only navigable by very shallow-draft boats.

After Hit,  Ramadi is the next major city along on the Euphrates. In Ramadi, a part of the river is diverted to feed a man-made lake called Lake Habbaniyah. Also, Shatt al-Hayy.

North of Basra, in southern Iraq, the river merges with the Tigris to form the Shatt al-Arab, this in turn empties into the Persian Gulf. The river used to divide into many channels at Basra, forming an extensive marshland, but the marshes were largely drained by the Saddam Hussein government in the 1990s as a means of driving out the rebellious Marsh Arabs. Since the 2003 invasion of Iraq, the drainage policy has been reversed, but it remains to be seen whether the marshes will recover.

 Al Hillah
 Al Kifl
 Al-Hanaya
 Anah
 Al Diwaniyah
 Fallujah
 Haditha
 Haqlaniyah
 Hīt, Iraq
 Iskandariya
 Khan al Baghdadi
 Kufa (Najaf)
 Karbala
 Musayyib
 Nasiriyah
 Al-Qa'im (town)
 Ramadi
 Rawah
 Saddat al Hindiyah
 Samawah

Al Anbar Province
The following section lists the cities and town in order along the Euphrates river, within the Al Anbar province.

Al Qaim District

 Qusaybah
 Sa' dah
 Al Ubaydi
 As Sammah
 Mish 'al
 Shaqaqivah
 Al Jurn
 Babiye
 Artajah
 An Nayah

Anah district

 Al Mahdiyah
 Al Ajjamiyah
 Rawa
 Anah

Haditha District

 Abu Tughrah
 Wastan
 Imam Nur ud din
 Sulaymaniyah
 Subhaniyah
 Matmash
 Hawijat Sulaymaniyah
 Mirjalan
 Arrabi
 Jadidah
 Dardasah
 Suwaynikh
 Siflah
 Tasiyah

Heet District 

 Sawari
 Jaudafyah
 Samaniyah
 Jubbah (Iraq)
 Jubariyah
 Waddahiyah
 Juwaniyah
 Mashad
 Al Baghdadi
 Charraf
 Mashad (duplicate city)
 Daniqiyah
 Marabdiyah
 Yardah
 Bashiri
 Samalah
 Zara
 Kassiya
 Mashquqah
 Qabatiyah
 Sidhadiyah
 Baziyah
 Khadaram
 Mufrawda'
 Sahliyah
 Jallawiyah
 Maskhan
 Natil
 Sadqah
 Hit, Iraq
 Banrani
 Khauza
 Abu Naml
 Zuwayyah
 Aqabah
 Abu tibban
 Khan Abu Rayt

Ramadi District

 Zanqurah
 Gothia
 Say yid 'Abd Allah 'Ali
 'Arab Abd al Khalat
 Ramadi
 'Ajal as Salim
 'Ali an Numan
 Fadil
 Malahimah
 Habbaniyah (Khaldia)

References

Sources
 22 July 2003: 094 A3 Anbar populated areas 1.pdf
 22 July 2003: 095 A3 Anbar populated areas 2.pdf